This is a list of the historical capitals of Serbian statehood:

See also
Serbia
History of Serbia

References

Serbia history-related lists
Serbia politics-related lists
Serbia geography-related lists

Serbia